Coordinator may refer to:
Administrative assistant, or sometimes a slightly higher-ranking employee
Facilitator, a position within an organization or business with significant responsibilities for acting as a liaison between departments, stakeholders and information sources, which requires many non-administrative competencies
Grammatical conjunction, also called a coordinating conjunction
An assistant coach in American or Canadian football; see offensive coordinator and defensive coordinator
Parenting coordinator, a mental health professional assigned by the Court to manage on-going issues in child custody

In fiction:
Coordinator Sprocket, a fictional character in Viewtiful Joe
Coordinators, genetically engineered humans in the Gundam SEED series